Missori is a Milan Metro station on Line 3. The station was opened on 16 December 1990 as part of the extension of the line from Duomo to Porta Romana.

The station is located at Piazza Giuseppe Missori, in the central area near the Velasca Tower, at the end of Via Giuseppe Mazzini, which by the Duomo leads to the south. Along with the Crocetta station, it can be used to access the University of Milan.

Like its nearest stations, it is underground in two overlapped tunnels.

References

Line 3 (Milan Metro) stations
Railway stations opened in 1990
1990 establishments in Italy
Railway stations in Italy opened in the 20th century